Peramatos Ermis B.C. is a Greek professional basketball team that was founded in 1978. The team is based in the Perama, Piraeus, Athens, Greece.

History
Peramatos Ermis absorbed ICBS in 2009, through a merger. ICBS had previously competed in the Greek 2nd Division.

Notable players

 Nikos Michalos
 Nikos Liakopoulos

Head coaches
 Dinos Kalampakos

External links
Official website 
Eurobasket.com Team Profile

1978 establishments in Greece
Basketball teams established in 1978
Basketball teams in Greece

el:Γ.Σ. Ερμής Περάματος